Islam Mohammad Moussa Batran (born 1 October 1994) is a Palestinian professional footballer who plays as a forward for Thai club Nongbua Pitchaya and the Palestine national team.

Club career

Shabab Yatta 
Batran signed his first professional contract with Shabab Yatta of the West Bank First League, where he was the team's top goalscorer in all competitions.

Ahli Al-Khaleel
Batran penned a two-year contract with West Bank Premier League side Ahli Al-Khaleel.

Wadi Degla SC 
Batran signed a one-year contract with Egyptian Premier League side Wadi Degla in August 2016 following a successful trial.

Al-Jazeera 
He signed a one-year contract with the Jordanian Pro League club Al-Jazeera.

International career
On 30 October 2015, Batran was called up to the Palestine under-23 team for the 2015 WAFF U-23 Championship in Qatar, where he scored Palestine's only two goals, the first against Jordan and the second again Yemen.

In March 2017, Islam was called up for Islamic Solidarity Games tournament 2017 where he played against Algeria, Oman and Turkey, where he scored two goals and provided assists in his apps.

He scored his first senior international goal in a 1–2 loss against Iraq on 2 August 2019.

Career statistics

International goals

References

External links 

 at National-Football-Teams

1994 births
Living people
Palestinian footballers
Ahli Al-Khaleel players
Wadi Degla SC players
Al-Jazeera (Jordan) players
Al-Hussein SC (Irbid) players
Hilal Al-Quds Club players
Islam Batran
Association football wingers
West Bank Premier League players
Palestine international footballers
Palestinian expatriate footballers
Expatriate footballers in Egypt
Expatriate footballers in Jordan
Expatriate footballers in Thailand
Palestinian expatriate sportspeople in Egypt
Palestinian expatriate sportspeople in Jordan
Palestinian expatriate sportspeople in Thailand
Palestine youth international footballers
Association football forwards
Footballers at the 2014 Asian Games
Asian Games competitors for Palestine